Phosphoryl chloride (commonly called phosphorus oxychloride) is a colourless liquid with the formula . It hydrolyses in moist air releasing phosphoric acid and fumes of hydrogen chloride. It is manufactured industrially on a large scale from phosphorus trichloride and oxygen or phosphorus pentoxide. It is mainly used to make phosphate esters such as tricresyl phosphate.

Structure 

Like phosphate,  is tetrahedral in shape. It features three P−Cl bonds and one strong P=O double bond, with an estimated bond dissociation energy of 533.5 kJ/mol. The P=O bond involves the donation of the lone pair electrons on oxygen p-orbitals to the antibonding combinations associated with phosphorus-chlorine bonds, thus constituting π bonding.

Phosphoryl chloride exists as neutral  molecules in the solid, liquid and gas states. This is unlike phosphorus pentachloride which exists as neutral  molecules in the gas and liquid states but adopts the ionic form  in the solid state.

Physical properties 
Also like water,  autoionizes, owing to the reversible formation of  cations and  anions.

Chemical properties 
 reacts with water to give hydrogen chloride and phosphoric acid:

Intermediates in the conversion have been isolated, including pyrophosphoryl chloride, .

Upon treatment with excess alcohols and phenols,  gives phosphate esters:

Such reactions are often performed in the presence of an HCl acceptor such as pyridine or an amine.

 can also act as a Lewis base, forming adducts with a variety of Lewis acids such as titanium tetrachloride:

The aluminium chloride adduct is quite stable, and so  can be used to remove  from reaction mixtures, for example at the end of a Friedel-Crafts reaction.

 reacts with hydrogen bromide in the presence of Lewis-acidic catalysts to produce .

Preparation 
Phosphoryl chloride can be prepared by many methods. Phosphoryl chloride was first reported in 1847 by the French chemist Adolphe Wurtz by reacting phosphorus pentachloride with water.

By oxidation 
The commercial method involves oxidation of phosphorus trichloride with oxygen:

An alternative method involves the oxidation of phosphorus trichloride with potassium chlorate:

Oxygenations 
The reaction of phosphorus pentachloride with phosphorus pentoxide.

The reaction of phosphorus pentachloride with boric acid or oxalic acid:

Other methods 
Reduction of tricalcium phosphate with carbon in the presence of chlorine gas:

The reaction of phosphorus pentoxide with sodium chloride is also reported:

Uses 
In one commercial application, phosphoryl chloride is used in the manufacture of phosphate esters. Triarylphosphates such as triphenyl phosphate and tricresyl phosphate are used as flame retardants and plasticisers for PVC. Trialkylphosphates such as tributyl phosphate are used as liquid–liquid extraction solvents in nuclear reprocessing and elsewhere.

In the semiconductor industry,  is used as a safe liquid phosphorus source in diffusion processes. The phosphorus acts as a dopant used to create n-type layers on a silicon wafer.

As a reagent 
In the laboratory,  is a reagent in dehydrations. One example involves conversion of formamides to isonitriles (isocyanides); primary amides to nitriles:

In a related reaction, certain aryl-substituted amides can be cyclized using the Bischler-Napieralski reaction.

Such reactions are believed to proceed via an imidoyl chloride. In certain cases, the imidoyl chloride is the final product. For example, pyridones and pyrimidones can be converted to chloro- derivatives such as 2-chloropyridines and 2-chloropyrimidines, which are intermediates in the pharmaceutical industry.

In the Vilsmeier-Haack reaction,  reacts with amides to produce a "Vilsmeier reagent", a chloro-iminium salt, which subsequently reacts with electron-rich aromatic compounds to produce aromatic aldehydes upon aqueous work-up.

References

Further reading 

Dehydrating agents
Oxychlorides
Phosphorus oxohalides
Phosphorus(V) compounds